Hesperobaris suavis is a species of flower weevil in the beetle family Curculionidae. It is found in North America.

References

Baridinae
Articles created by Qbugbot
Beetles described in 1892